Rheinheimera coerulea is a Gram-negative, non-spore-forming, aerobic and motile bacterium from the genus of Rheinheimera which has been isolated from a freshwater creek in Taiwan.

References 

Chromatiales
Bacteria described in 2018